Campillo de Deleitosa is a municipality located in the province of Cáceres, Extremadura, Spain.

It has been described as the smallest and oldest town in Extremadura.

References

External links

Municipalities in the Province of Cáceres